This list of churches in Halsnæs Municipality lists church buildings in Halsnæs Municipality, Denmark.

List

See also
 Listed buildings in Gribskov Municipality

References

External links

 Nordens kirker: Nordvestsjælland

 
Lists of churches in Denmark